Aethes terriae is a species of moth of the family Tortricidae. It is found in the United States, where it has been recorded from Michigan, Indiana and Maryland.

The ground color of the forewings is white with black or buff markings and scattered buff scales. The hindwings are pale drab. Adults have been recorded on wing in June and July, probably in one generation per year.

Etymology
The species is named in honor of Terri Balogh.

References

terriae
Moths described in 2002
Moths of North America